Sullivan Nunatak is a long, narrow nunatak 2 nautical miles (3.7 km) east of the south end of Wellman Cliffs in the Geologists Range. Mapped by the United States Geological Survey (USGS) from tellurometer surveys and Navy air photos, 1960–62. Named by the Advisory Committee on Antarctic Names (US-ACAN) for James G. Sullivan, United States Antarctic Research Program (USARP) geologist at McMurdo Station, winter 1961 and the 1961-62 summer season.

Nunataks of Oates Land